Below is a list of settlements in Leicestershire (including the City of Leicester) by population based on the results of the 2011 census, where the population exceeded 2,000 (52 locations), as well as county and regional demographics in detail.



Demographics

City and county 
The City of Leicester's and its contiguous urban extension has a population of 509,000 inhabitants. The next largest settlements are two towns – Loughborough and Hinckley – with populations in the range of 40 to 80 thousands.

The 2011 list of UK metropolitan areas shows the population of the Leicester Metropolitan Area to have been 0.75 million.

Government projections calculated in Q4 2014 show that the combined population of Leicester/Leicestershire (excluding quasi-interdependent, Rutland) will increase by some 7.6% to approximately 1.06 million in the ten years from the 2011 census to the date of the upcoming 2021 census.

Wider environs 
A 'conservative' Leicester City Region which extends beyond the county boundary to include, Corby, Kettering, Rutland and Wellingborough districts would have a population estimated at 1.34 million. A more 'liberal' city region adding Northampton and Daventry would have a total of 1.60 million inhabitants (2015).

This region corresponds approximately to Eurostat Nomenclature of Territorial Units for Statistics (NUTS); EurostatNUTS UKF2 region (Combined Leicestershire/City of Leicester, Northamptonshire and Rutland); population 1.77 million (2015) and a projected population of 1.85 million (2020) that also includes East Northamptonshire and South Northamptonshire districts.

An even more 'expansive' Leicester City Region might extend further south- and eastwards beyond the limits of the EurostatNUTS UKF2 region into Bedfordshire, Buckinghamshire, Huntingdonshire, Lincolnshire and Warwickshire. This assumes that the competing 'pulls' of the neighbouring cities of Coventry, Nottingham, Derby, Peterborough, Lichfield, Birmingham, Lincoln, Cambridge, Oxford, St. Albans through to the more distant capital (City of London, City of Westminster, Southwark), are not so strong as that of the Leicester 'city region' / EurostatNUTS UKF2 region.

List of larger settlements#I/IIx/ villages#IIIx by population 

Notes:<small>

 The Office of National Statistics (ONS) subdivide built-up areas into sectors which do not respect administrative or political boundaries. If those areas have a strong city/town/village identity, for population purposes they are classed into a distinct area.
 Leicester in particular will include population counts from suburbs which are not within the city boundaries – but are close enough to be counted together.
 * – District HQ location.
 † – Civil parish population figure.

Summary of larger settlements#I/IIx/ villages#IIIx in EurostatNUTS UKF2 region 
(City of Leicester''~'metro''' and counties of Leicestershire, Northamptonshire & Rutland)

The above table summarises the key centres within the UKF2 Region by population range (category) and number of occurrences (count). The combined population of the EurostatNUTS UKF2 region is projected to reach the 2 million mark just after the 2031 census (2031-2).

See also 

List of places in Leicestershire
List of civil parishes in Leicestershire
Leicester Built-Up Area
List of Northamptonshire settlements by population
List of settlements in Rutland by population
NUTS statistical regions of the United Kingdom

References

External links 
 Link to ONS built up area statistics

 
Settlements
Leicestershire